Rhimphalea linealis is a small moth in the family Crambidae that is found in Papua New Guinea. The species was first described by George Hamilton Kenrick in 1907.

It has a wingspan of 30 mm.

References

External links

Moths described in 1907
Spilomelinae